The Chick Is in the Mail is an anthology of fantasy stories, edited by Esther Friesner with the assistance of Martin H. Greenberg, with a cover by Larry Elmore. It consists of works featuring female protagonists by (mostly) female authors. It was first published in paperback by Baen Books in October 2000; a hardcover edition was issued the same year. It was the fourth of a number of similarly themed anthologies edited by Friesner.

The book collects 15 short stories and novelettes and one poem by various fantasy authors, with an introduction by Friesner and a section of notes about the authors.

Contents
 "Introduction" (Esther Friesner)
 "To His Iron-Clad Mistress" (poem) (Kent Patterson)
 "Sweet Charity" (Elizabeth Moon)
 "The Catcher in the Rhine" (Harry Turtledove)
 "With the Knight Male (Apologies to Rudyard Kipling)" (Charles Sheffield)
 "Patterns in the Chain" (Steven Piziks)
 "Arms and the Woman" (Nancy Kress)
 "Fun with Hieroglyphics" (Margaret Ball)
 "Troll by Jury" (Esther Friesner)
 "Looking for Rhonda Honda" (William Sanders)
 "The Case of Prince Charming" (Robin Wayne Bailey)
 "Incognito, Ergo Sum" (Karen Everson)
 "Chain of Command" (Leslie What and Nina Kiriki Hoffman)
 "The Thief & The Roller Derby Queen: An Essay on the Importance of Formal Education" (Eric Flint)
 "The Right Bitch" (Doranna Durgin)
 "Foxy Boxer Gal Fights Giant Monster King!" (Pierce Askegren)
 "Hallah Iron-Thighs and the Change of Life" (K. D. Wentworth)
 "About the Authors" (uncredited)

References

External links
 

2000 anthologies
Fantasy anthologies